Janício de Jesus Gomes Martins (born 30 November 1979), known simply as Janício, is a Cape Verdean retired footballer who played as a right back.

Club career
Born in Tarrafal, Janício started playing football for local Club Desportivo Amabox Barcelona Tarrafal, moving in 2001 to Portugal with C.F. Estrela da Amadora but failing to make any official appearances for the second division club. He continued playing in the country in the following three seasons, representing S.C.U. Torreense in the third level.

In the 2005–06 campaign, Janício moved straight into the Primeira Liga with Vitória de Setúbal, appearing in 32 games in his first year as the side – who at one point ranked as the team with the fewest goals conceded in the major European leagues – finished in eighth position, amidst serious financial problems. In his third season he played 37 official matches (3,214 minutes of action), helping the Sadinos to win the inaugural Portuguese League Cup.

In the summer of 2009, Janício signed a two-year contract with Anorthosis Famagusta FC of the Cypriot First Division.

Honours
Vitória de Setúbal
Taça da Liga: 2007–08

References

External links

1979 births
Living people
Cape Verdean footballers
Footballers from Santiago, Cape Verde
Association football defenders
Primeira Liga players
Liga Portugal 2 players
Segunda Divisão players
C.F. Estrela da Amadora players
S.C.U. Torreense players
Vitória F.C. players
S.C. Covilhã players
C.D. Pinhalnovense players
Cypriot First Division players
Anorthosis Famagusta F.C. players
Cape Verde international footballers
Cape Verdean expatriate footballers
Expatriate footballers in Portugal
Expatriate footballers in Cyprus
Cape Verdean expatriate sportspeople in Portugal